John Woolsey may refer to:
 John M. Woolsey, American judge
 John M. Woolsey Jr., his son, American attorney
 John William Woolsey, Canadian businessman and president of Quebec Bank